John Kirby (30 September 1910 – 15 June 1960) was an English football goalkeeper.

Kirby joined Derby County from Newhall United in April 1929 and made his debut in the 1929–30 season. In 1934 he was part of the Derby side that toured Germany. Kirby defied the German authorities by being the only member of the team to refuse to give the Nazi salute before each game. He left in August 1938 to become player-manager of Folkestone Town, a position he held until August 1939.

References

1910 births
1960 deaths
People from Overseal
Footballers from Derbyshire
English footballers
Association football goalkeepers
Newhall United F.C. players
Derby County F.C. players
Folkestone F.C. players
English Football League players
English football managers
Folkestone F.C. managers